is a district located in Niigata Prefecture, Japan.

As of July 1, 2019, the district had an estimated population of 11,481 with a density of 362 persons per km2. The total area was 31.71 km2.

Towns and villages
The district consists of one town:

 Tagami

History 

When the district was formed back in the Meiji Period, the district covered the cities of Sanjō and Mitsuke, the town of Tagami, and parts of Kamo and the northern part of Nagaoka.

 On January 1, 1934 - The former town of Sanjō (part of the new city of Sanjō) gained city status.
 On 1954 - The cities of Mitsuke and Kamo were formed by merging the surrounding areas, including the former respective towns of Mitsuke and Kamo.

Recent mergers 
 On April 1, 2005 - The town of Nakanoshima was merged into the expanded city of Nagaoka.
 On May 1, 2005 - The town of Sakae and the village of Shitada merged with the city of Sanjō to create a new city of Sanjō.

Districts in Niigata Prefecture